Connor MacDonald (born 13 January 2003) is a professional Australian rules footballer with the Hawthorn Football Club in the Australian Football League (AFL).

Early career

MacDonald attended Haileybury Grammar, where his sports coach, former  champion Matthew Lloyd oversaw his football development. On the weekends he played with the Dandenong Stingrays in the State under 18 competition where, in a Covid interrupted season he managed to average just under 30 disposals in his four games in 2021.

AFL career

In the 2021 AFL draft,  used their third pick, number 26, to draft MacDonald. MacDonald debuted for Hawthorn alongside Josh Ward in the opening round of the 2022 AFL season against  at the MCG.

MacDonald managed to play the first nine games of the season before being rested under the club policy of resting young players to help freshen them up for the long season.

Statistics
Updated to the end of the 2022 season.

|-
| 2022 ||  || 31
| 20 || 9 || 9 || 160 || 103 || 263 || 67 || 35 || 0.5 || 0.5 || 8.0 || 5.2 || 13.2 || 3.4 || 1.8 || 0
|- class="sortbottom"
! colspan=3| Career
! 20 !! 9 !! 9 !! 160 !! 103 !! 263 !! 67 !! 35 !! 0.5 || 0.5 || 8.0 || 5.2 || 13.2 || 3.4 || 1.8 || 0
|}

References

External links

Living people
2003 births
Hawthorn Football Club players
Box Hill Football Club players
Australian rules footballers from Victoria (Australia)
People educated at Haileybury (Melbourne)